Sri Krishnarjuna Vijayam  is a 1996 Indian Telugu-language Hindu mythological film, produced by B. Venkatarama Reddy under the Chandamama Vijaya Combines banner and directed by Singeetam Srinivasa Rao. It stars Nandamuri Balakrishna, Roja  with music composed by Madhavapeddi Suresh. The film won four Nandi Awards.

Plot 
The film begins with a series of tournaments at the fort of Hastinapuram, where Bhima and Duryodhana compete in Gada Yuddh, with the game turning into a dispute of achivement. Dronacharya intervenes and declares them equivalent in ability. Afterwards, Arjuna shows his extraordinary talent in archery and Dronacharya praises him as a powerful warrior. Eventually, Karna arrives and challenges Arjuna, but is vilified for his caste. Though Kunti recognizes Karna as her child, she hides the information, as she afraid of outside judgement. However, Duryodhana keeps him to save face as per the ruse of Shakuni by acclaiming him as king of Anga. Therefrom, Karna dedicates his life to Duryodhana and becomes his soulmate. 

Next, Dronacharya asks Arjuna his tuitional fee Guru Dakshina that to catch hold of Drupada, king of Panchala, and spins backward. At one time, they are besties who promise him to share half of his kingdom. Destitute he reaches for help when Drona is kicked out and he pledges to get him down. Listening to it, Arjuna attacks and seizes Drupada and throws him under the toes of the mentor. Humiliated, Drupada seeks vengeance when Lord Krishna calms him down and instructs him to conduct the Putrakameshti yagnam to beget a son who could slay Drona and daughter to espouse Arjuna. From that fire, the twins Dhrishtadyumna and Draupadi are born. Since birth, Draupadi adores Krishna and he too endears her as his sister. 

Meanwhile, Dharmaraj (Yudhishthira) is crowned as the Prince of Hastinapuram for which he is envied by Duryodhana and the other Kaurava. Henceforth, Kunti is perturbed for their safety and prayers to Krishna. Lord Krishna consoles her and works to guard and guide her sons through troubles in their life. On the eve of Krishna's birthday, the Pandavas visit Dvārakā when he calls a divine architect Mayasura (Maya) who designs and accords them a spectacular building, the "Mayasabha". Draupadi also lands when she crushes Arjuna. Sage Narada gifts a fruit and asks him to present it to his favorite. Krishna is about to share it when he cuts his finger. When Draupadi bandages him by tearing her saree, he promises to pay back her debt at right time.  

Later, Pandavas proceeds on a trip for expanding the kingdom. In his pathway, Arjuna reaches Rameswaram where he spots Ram Seth. Narada also grounds and questions him why did Lord Rama need to depend upon Vanara as he is a great archer who can build the bridge with arrows?  Accordingly, he replies the viaduct built with arrows is highly potent which no one can destroy. Being aware of it, the infuriated Anjineeya (Hanuman) tackles and challenges Arjuna. It is impossible to transport the group of Vanaras to such a bridge which cannot bear him alone. As a result, Arjuna constructs it using his skills of archery twice and Anjineeya collapses it. Like this, he makes a final attempt and readied a pyre if it fails. This minute, it stands firm when Arjuna spots Krishna had lent his shoulder to the foundation to save his external body. Suddenly, Anjineeya recognizes Krishna as his Lord Rama who advises him to decorate as Arjuna's flag.      

Consequently, Duryodhana is frightened by the big hit of Arjuna and plots to eliminate Pandavas along with Shakuni. They act together to construct a wax house at Varanasi. Drutarastra sends Pandavas claiming it is the responsibility of a price to perform rituals therein. Krishna gazes at their evil play and warns Bheema to be alert. So, he digs a tunnel to the nearby forest. At midnight, the brutal puts fire but Pandavas and Kunti break out of jeopardy. Following, Bheema slaughters Hidimbasura, a rakshasa (demon), whose sister, Hidimbi, had fallen for Bheema at first sight. Hidimbi and Bheema are married and they have a son, Ghatotkacha. As of today, the Pandavas hides under the guise of Brahmins at Ekachakrapuram on the guidance of sage Vyasa. 

Upon which, a monster Bakasura plagues to whom they should send two oxen, a cartload of food, and a human being every day.  It so happens that, the house owners of the Pandavas get their time Kunti sends Bheema instead of their son who emerges as the victor by death blowing him. Simultaneously, Drupada arranges a svayamvara for Draupadi with an archery contest to win her. All the kings of the royal dynasty are invited but nobody would do so including Shalya, Jarasandha, and Duryodhana. Here Krishna tricks Karna into losing the contest. Nevertheless, Arjuna as a brahmin wins the contest when his true identity Pandavas comes out. They bestow Drupadi as alms to their mother Kunti commands them to share being unbeknownst of reality. At that moment, they are under dichotomy. At last, Krishna clarifies it, supports Kunti's proposal, and sanctions the nuptials. Finally, the movie ends on a happy note with all siblings, marrying Draupadi.

Cast

Soundtrack 

Music composed by Madhavapeddi Suresh Music released on Supreme Music Company.

Awards 
Nandi Awards
 Best Music Director – Madhavapeddi Suresh
 Best Costume Designer - G. Babu
 Best Makeup Artist - Sathyam
 Best Art Director - G. Chalam

References

External links 

1996 films
Hindu mythological films
Films based on the Mahabharata
Films directed by Singeetam Srinivasa Rao
1990s Telugu-language films
Films scored by Madhavapeddi Suresh